Established initially as Alta Villa by Italian immigrants in 1915, Little Italy is an unincorporated community in Pulaski and Perry counties in the U.S. state of Arkansas. The culturally rich and historically significant hamlet is located in high terrain along Arkansas Highway 300 amidst the northeastern foothills of the Ouachita Mountains bestriding Wye Mountain and Kryer Mountain. As part of a multi-decade heritage preservation effort, its residents are currently seeking status as an incorporated municipality.

See also

Other historically Italian settlements in Arkansas
Catholic Point, Arkansas
 Sunnyside Plantation, Arkansas
Tontitown, Arkansas

Additional related information
Italian Americans
Italian diaspora
Little Italy

References

Further reading 
 Barnes, Kenneth C. Anti-Catholicism in Arkansas: How Politicians, the Press, the Klan, and Religious Leaders Imagined an Enemy, 1910–1960. Fayetteville, AR: The University of Arkansas Press, 2016.
 Cia, M.B. "Notes on Little Italy." Pulaski County Historical Review 12 (December 1964): 53–55.
 Dorer, Chris. “A Bootlegger’s Oasis: Central Arkansas’s Craving for Little Italy’s Prohibition-Era Concoctions.” Pulaski County Historical Review 65 (Spring 2017): 3–10.
 ———. Images of America: Little Italy, Arkansas. Charleston, SC: Arcadia Publishing, 2015.
 Dorer, Christopher A. Boy the Stories I Could Tell: A Narrative History of the Italians of Little Italy, Arkansas. Winfield, KS: Central Plains Book Manufacturing Co., 2002.
 ———. “Little Italy: A Historical and Sociological Survey.” Pulaski County Historical Review 51 (Summer 2003): 43–54.
 Goldsmith, Adolph O. "Wine From Little Italy's Grapes: Italians of This Unusual Colony Near Little Rock Carry on Traditions of Native Land." Historical Document Archive. Little Italy, Arkansas Historical Society, Little Italy, Arkansas. Facsimile of an apparent newspaper article printed circa 1939, missing name of newspaper and publication date.
 Halliburton, Arthur. “Little Italy is Still Ethnically Closely-Knit; But Town Has Lost Old World Flavor since 1915.” Arkansas Democrat. November 26, 1972, p. 3A.
 "Little Italy Celebrates." Arkansas Gazette. August 9, 1931, p. 9B–10B.
 Smith, Sybil. "Notes on the Italian settlers of Pulaski County" Pulaski County Historical Review 38 (Fall 1990): 51–57.
 Tebbetts, Diane Ott. "Transmission of Folklife Patterns in Two Rural Arkansas Ethnic Groups: The Germans and Italians in Perry County." PhD diss., Indiana University, 1987.
 Womack, Patsy. Living the Times: A Bicentennial History of Perry County. N.p.: 1976.
 Woods, James M. Mission and Memory: A History of the Catholic Church in Arkansas. Little Rock: August House, 1993.

External links
 

Italian-American culture in Arkansas
Italian diaspora in North America
 
Populated places established in 1915
Unincorporated communities in Arkansas
Unincorporated communities in Perry County, Arkansas
Unincorporated communities in Pulaski County, Arkansas